Spilarctia coorgensis is a moth in the family Erebidae. It was described by Jagbir Singh Kirti and Navneet Singh Gill in 2010. It is found in Karnataka, India.

References

Moths described in 2010
coorgensis